Brachyopa cinereovittata (Bigot, 1884), the Grey-striped Sapeater, is a rare species of syrphid fly. It has been observed in northwestern North America. Hoverflies get their names from the ability to remain nearly motionless while in flight. The adults are also known as flower flies for they are commonly found around and on flowers, from which they get both energy-giving nectar and protein-rich  pollen. Larvae for this genus are of the rat-tailed type. B.cinereovittata larvae have not been described.

Description
For terms see Morphology of Diptera.

Size 

Head
The frons is black  that is only visible in a median longitudinal stripe and  just above the reddish color.The lower part of the face is polished luteous reddish. The upper portion is densely greyish yellow pollinose, the pollen extending along the narrow orbital  margins to join that on the occiput below the eyes, and also narrowly upwards  along the eyes to join the more yellow pollen of the front. In profile the face  is triangularly excavated, the epistoma not quite as prominent as the antennal  base. The facial side  margins have very short, sparse white pile., The front has longer, subappressed, whitish pile. The antenna are reddish;.The brown :arista is bare or with  very short pubescent. The antennal prominence is wholly polished luteous reddish.The eyes are Holoptic in the male.

Thorax
The scutum is opaque brownish grey; with two narrow, median,  longitudinal, posteriorly somewhat divergent, shining brown stripes on the anterior two-thirds. There are broader, interrupted ones on either side with an area of the  same color above the base of the wings. The humeri are  reddish yellow The postalar calli  reddish yellow The scutellum is reddish yellow, the latter with a similar pile to that on the  thorax. The pleurae are almost all reddish, with sub-obscuring whitish pile pallidly brassy and subappressed.

Wings
The  wings are pale yellowish with yellow veins. Only the apical cross-veins are brown. The squamae are pallidly yellow, the fringe more yellowish. The halteres are yellow.
M1 outwardly oblique vein R4+5 with apical section shorter than crossvein r-m 

Legs 
The femora are luteous basally and apically, with a diffuse brown medially. The hind femora has two rows of black bristles on the lower part of the apical half. The tibia are yellow with dirty brownish bands on the apical third. The tarsi are yellow, with the last two segments black.

Abdomen
The first two abdominal segments wholly reddish; the third segment shining reddish  brown, the apex in the middle portion somewhat reddish; the fourth and fifth  shining blackish brown, the apices narrowly luteous. The pile pale yellowish, although there appear, in some lights, incomplete black pilose fascise on the  bases of the third and fourth segments.  </ref>  as Brachyopa basilaris

References

Eristalinae
Insects described in 1884
Diptera of North America
Taxa named by Jacques-Marie-Frangile Bigot